General elections were held in India on 27 April, 2 May and 7 May 1996 to elect the members of the 11th Lok Sabha. The elections resulted in a hung parliament with no single party having a clear majority. The Bharatiya Janata Party, which had won the most seats, formed a short-lived government under Prime Minister Atal Bihari Vajpayee. However, two weeks later the United Front coalition was able to secure a parliamentary majority and H. D. Deve Gowda of Janata Dal became Prime Minister. In 1997 Inder Kumar Gujral, also from the United Front, succeeded Gowda as Prime Minister. Due to the instability, early elections were held in 1998. The elections were the first since 1980 in which every states' seats were elected in a single election period.

Background
The Indian National Congress government of Prime Minister P. V. Narasimha Rao came into the election on the back of several government scandals and accusations of mishandling. Seven cabinet members had resigned during the previous term, and Rao himself faced charges of corruption. The Congress Party more generally had been plagued in recent years by a series of splits, issues conflicts and factional disputes that had seen various key regional parties and figures abandon the party. In particular, the high-profile May 1995 defection of Arjun Singh and Narayan Datt Tiwari to form the new All India Indira Congress (Tiwari) party underscored the internal divisions within the INC.

The government was further weakened by a series of major scandals breaking less than 12 months from the election. In July 1995 it was found a former Congress youth leader had murdered his wife and tried to destroy the evidence by stuffing her corpse into a tandoor. In August 1995 the Vohra Report was finally released to the parliament, decrying that a politician-criminal nexus was "virtually running a parallel government, pushing the state apparatus into irrelevance". Government credibility fell further still when in late 1995 when violence significantly worsened in the Kashmir region, and sporadic fighting and ethnic tensions boiled over in Punjab province. As a result of the scandals, the Rao government went into the 1996 election at a low of ebb of public support.

Campaign
The elections triggered a significant realignment of political forces in Indians, with all-India parties attempting to construct widespread regional coalitions with minor parties in order to secure a central majority. Such political negotiations were to become an increasingly necessary process in Indian politics over the next two decades as the dominance of the INC declined and smaller, ethnic and regional parties took its place. The Bharatiya Janata Party, led by Lal Krishna Advani attempted to add several regional coalition partners - most notably the All India Anna Dravida Munnetra Kazhagam and the Bahujan Samaj Party, but was ultimately unsuccessful in overcoming ideological differences. Yet it did join with several strong regional partners - Shiv Sena, Haryana Vikas Party, and the Samata Party. The Congress party attempted to form regional allies as well, most notably with the All India Anna Dravida Munnetra Kazhagam (AIADMK).

The so-called "Third Force" during the 1996 elections was the National Front (NF). After its collapse in 1990, the coalition had chopped and changed before reuniting in the run up to the 1996 election. Three main parties grouped back together in September 1995 in hopes of presenting a viable political choice - the Left Front, Janata Dal and the Telugu Desam Party. It attempted to build a wider coalition of regional partners and state parties, however negotiations repeatedly broke down, and no consensus could be arrived at on a 'common minimum program' - a platform of issues on which all parties could agree upon. A split in the Uttar Pradesh government in December 1995 divided the front further. Finally, lacking a strong leader or common set of principles, the main three parties joined with the Samajwadi Party in a common goal of simply denying power to either the Congress or BJP. Thus a characteristic of the 1996 elections was a large number of strong regional and state parties declined to form an alliance with any of the three major contenders for government.

In January only a few months before the election, a major scandal erupted: the Jain hawala scandal. Jain, an industrialist in the steel and power sectors, was revealed to have given US$33 million in bribes to politicians from nearly all major parties in return for favours. Further shocking the public, Jain had also channelled money to Kashmiri Muslim militants. In the first wave of names implicated were three Rao cabinet members, Arjun Singh from the breakaway Congress (T) party, Bharatiya Janata Party leader Lal Krishna Advani, Sharad Yadav (leader of the Janata Dal Parliamentary Party), and former Congress Prime Minister Rajiv Gandhi. Almost 115 names would eventually be released, and numerous candidates and ministers were forced to resign in the aftermath. Most significantly was the forced resignation of L.K. Advani, with Atal Bihari Vajpayee taking over as leader of the BJP.

The BJP ran a campaign centred around a four-point plan which aimed for probity of public life, self-reliance in the economy, social harmony and greater security. It strongly advocated an economic plan which would significantly scale back government intervention and encourage capital investment and creation. It stressed the role of Hindutva in its vision for India, creating a more Hindu orientated state by banning cow slaughter, introducing a uniform civil code and removing the special status of Kashmir. The Congress Party attempted to campaign on its foreign policy record, its handling of the numerous natural and ethnic crises that had emerged over the past five years, and on better concessions for ethnic minorities and separated state governments. It additionally stressed the economic gains already made by the government due to its Liberalization policies post 1992. Janata Dal and the National Front campaigned on maintaining a strong public sector though with some commitment to deregulation and anti-corruption measures. It pushed other more populist measures as well, such as more state-run infrastructure projects, subsidised fertilizer, and increased education investment.

Results
The election delivered an unclear mandate and resulted in a hung parliament. The result was the worst result for the INC in history to that date, with commentators blaming the poor result on the personal unpopularity of Prime Minister Rao and the numerous internal divisions that had dogged the party. Congress was almost wiped out in its traditional strongholds of Uttar Pradesh & Bihar with many stalwarts like Ram Lakhan Singh Yadav, Jagannath Mishra, Satyendra Narain Sinha suffered electoral setbacks. The BJP became the largest party within the Lok Sabha, a first for a non-Congress party, although it secured neither a significant increase in the popular vote or enough seats to secure a parliamentary majority.

Following Westminster custom, Indian President Shankar Dayal Sharma invited Atal Bihari Vajpayee as leader of the BJP to form a government. Sworn in on 15 May, the new Prime Minister was given two weeks to prove majority support in parliament. In the weeks leading up to the first confidence vote on 31 May, the BJP attempted to build a coalition by moderating positions to garner support from regional and Muslim parties, however sectarian issues and fears of certain nationalist policies of the BJP hampered efforts. On 28 May, Vajpayee conceded that he could not arrange support from more than 200 of the 545 members of parliament, and thus resigned rather than face the confidence vote, ending his 13-day government.

The second largest party, the Indian National Congress, declined to attempt to form a government, instead choosing to support one headed by Janata Dal, and chose Karnataka Chief Minister H. D. Deve Gowda to assume the Prime Minister post. Janata Dal and a bloc of smaller parties thus formed the United Front, with outside support from INC. Gowda resigned on 21 April 1997 to pave way for I. K. Gujral, who maintained good relations with INC.

However the Fodder Scam resulted in many United Front members demanding the resignation of Lalu Prasad Yadav, an alliance partner and the then Chief Minister of Bihar. Yadav retaliated by breaking away from Janata Dal and forming Rashtriya Janata Dal (RJD) on 3 July 1997. Out of 45 Janata Dal members of parliament, 17 left the party and supported Yadav. However, the new party continued in the United Front and Gujral's government was saved from immediate danger. Gujral resigned 11 months later when INC withdrew support to the government, and the country went back to the polls in 1998.

See also
Election Commission of India
1992 Indian presidential election

References

 
April 1996 events in Asia
May 1996 events in Asia
1996 in Indian politics
India
General elections in India